Little Andaman Group is a group of islands of the Andaman Islands, which include all islands south of Duncan Passage. It belongs to the South Andaman administrative district, part of the Indian union territory of Andaman and Nicobar Islands.

Geography
The group includes The Brothers (Andaman), and Little Andaman Island.

Administration
Politically, Little Andaman group is also a tehsil of Andaman.

Demographics 
The main village of Kwate-tu-Kwage is located on Hut Bay. only Little Andaman island is inhabited.

Image gallery

References

External links

Islands of the Andaman and Nicobar Islands